Mitchell County is a county located in the U.S. state of North Carolina. As of the 2020 census, the population was 14,903. Its county seat is Bakersville.

The county is home to the "Mineral City of the World", Spruce Pine and Roan Mountain which includes the world's largest natural rhododendron garden, and the longest stretch of grassy bald in the Appalachian range.  Throughout the year such festivals as North Carolina Mineral and Gem Festival and North Carolina Rhododendron Festival bring many visitors to the area.

History
The county was formed in 1861 from parts of Burke County, Caldwell County, McDowell County, Watauga County, and Yancey County.  It was named for Elisha Mitchell, professor of mathematics, chemistry, geology, and mineralogy at the University of North Carolina from 1818 until his death in 1857. Dr. Mitchell was the first scientist to argue that a nearby peak in the Black Mountains was the highest point east of the Mississippi River. He measured the mountain's height and climbed and explored it. In 1857 he fell to his death on a waterfall on the side of the mountain. The mountain was subsequently named Mount Mitchell in his honor.

By 1899, Mitchell County had a sundown town policy of preventing Black Americans from living or working in the county. By the early 1920s, Black Americans began working and living in the county in larger numbers, especially as mine workers and as convict laborers constructing local infrastructure, including new state highways such as what is now US Highway 19E. In September 1923, a 75-year-old White woman named Alice Thomas accused John Goss, an escaped Black convict laborer, of raping her. A White mob formed in Spruce Pine, and when they could not locate the fugitive Goss, the mob (which included members of the Ku Klux Klan) forced nearly all of the Black people onto train cars heading out of the county. Governor Cameron Morrison, an ally of the infrastructure construction and mining industries, declared martial law and called in the National Guard in an attempt to stop the mob violence, but by the time the Guard units arrived two days later, the Black mine and construction laborers had already been driven from the county. The National Guard occupied Spruce Pine for nearly two weeks. Despite Morrison's declaration of martial law having little effect, it was the first time martial law was declared in response to an instance of mass racial violence in the United States. Ultimately, 86 members of the White supremacist mob were indicted for their actions, many of whom pled guilty to minor offences. Goss was arrested in Hickory four days after the alleged rape, and at the orders of the Governor, jailed in Raleigh to avert lynching. He was tried three weeks later in Mitchell County, convicted by jury after five minutes of deliberation, and executed by electrocution.

The county took a direct hit from "The Storm of the Century", also known as the "’93 Superstorm", or "The (Great) Blizzard of 1993".  This storm event was similar in nature to a hurricane.  The storm occurred between March 12–13, 1993, on the East Coast of North America.  Parts of Cuba, Gulf Coast States, Eastern United States and Eastern Canada were greatly impacted. The county suffered another tragic event on May 3, 2002, when a fire broke out at the Mitchell County jail in Bakersville, North Carolina.  Eight men lost their lives in the fire.

Mitchell County was one of the three entirely dry counties in North Carolina, along with Graham and Yancey, but in March, 2009, after much controversy, the Town of Spruce Pine approved beer, wine and limited retail sale.

Geography

It is the fourth-smallest county in North Carolina by land area and second-smallest by total area. The northwest sections of county  border the State of Tennessee. Sections of both the Blue Ridge Parkway and Appalachian Trail are located in the county. Parts of the Pisgah National Forest and Roan Mountain State Park are located in the northern sections of the county. All over Mitchell and neighboring Avery County you will find several conservation lands within the Pisgah Forest. Little Yellow Mountain is a natural land conservation area and one day it will be turned over to the state.

National protected areas 
 Blue Ridge Parkway (part)
 Cherokee National Forest (part)
 Pisgah National Forest (part)

State and local protected areas 
 Bare Dark Sky Observatory (part)
 Yellow Mountain State Natural Area (part)

Major water body 
 North Toe River

Adjacent counties
 Carter County, Tennessee - north-northeast
 Avery County - northeast
 McDowell County - south
 Yancey County - southwest
 Unicoi County, Tennessee - north-northwest

Major highways

Demographics

2020 census

As of the 2020 United States census, there were 14,903 people, 6,344 households, and 4,031 families residing in the county.

2000 census
As of the census of 2000, there were 15,687 people, 6,551 households, and 4,736 families residing in the county.  The population density was 71 people per square mile (27/km2).  There were 7,919 housing units at an average density of 36 per square mile (14/km2).  The racial makeup of the county was 97.87% White, 0.22% Black or African American, 0.45% Native American, 0.20% Asian, 0.66% from other races, and 0.60% from two or more races.  1.98% of the population were Hispanic or Latino of any race.

There were 6,551 households, out of which 27.40% had children under the age of 18 living with them, 60.90% were married couples living together, 8.10% had a female householder with no husband present, and 27.70% were non-families. 25.20% of all households were made up of individuals, and 12.00% had someone living alone who was 65 years of age or older.  The average household size was 2.37 and the average family size was 2.82.

In the county, the population was spread out, with 21.20% under the age of 18, 6.80% from 18 to 24, 26.40% from 25 to 44, 27.10% from 45 to 64, and 18.60% who were 65 years of age or older.  The median age was 42 years. For every 100 females there were 95.60 males.  For every 100 females age 18 and over, there were 92.30 males.

The median income for a household in the county was $30,508, and the median income for a family was $36,367. Males had a median income of $26,550 versus $20,905 for females. The per capita income for the county was $15,933.  About 10.70% of families and 13.80% of the population were below the poverty line, including 17.20% of those under age 18 and 16.40% of those age 65 or over.

Ancestry
As of 2015, the largest self-reported ancestry groups in Mitchell County were:

Law and government
Mitchell County is a member of the regional High Country Council of Governments.

Politics 
Owing to its Civil War-era Unionist sympathies, along with its rural character, Mitchell has continuously been an overwhelmingly Republican county, even during the Solid South Democratic era. No Democratic presidential candidate has carried Mitchell County since Samuel J. Tilden in 1876. However, since Tilden's win, every Republican candidate has obtained at least sixty percent of the county's vote, with the solitary exception of the 1912 election when the party was divided between the two candidacies of William Howard Taft and Theodore Roosevelt, the latter of whom carried the county.

As of October 2022, 58 percent of active voters in Mitchell County are registered Republicans—the highest such rate statewide—while Democrats have their lowest county registration rate.

2016 presidential primaries 
In the 2016 Republican Primary in Mitchell County, Donald Trump received 1,775 votes (or 46.8 percent of the total votes) followed by Ted Cruz who came in second with 1,188 votes (or 31.3% of the total votes).  In the 2016 Democratic Primary, Bernie Sanders received 450 votes (57.9% of the total) whereas Hillary Clinton only won 314 votes (40.4% of the total).  In the general election Donald Trump received 6,282 votes (or 77.6% of the total vote) whereas Hillary Clinton only received 1,596 votes (19.7% of the vote) and Libertarian Candidate Gary Johnson only received 138 votes (1.7% of total votes in the county).

Education
Mitchell High School is a comprehensive four-year high school (9-12) centrally located in the community of Ledger when built in 1978.

Spruce Pine is home to three schools: Greenlee Primary (K-2), Deyton Elementary (3–5), and Harris Middle (6–8). Bakersville is home to two schools: Gouge Primary (K-4) and Bowman Middle (5–8).

Mayland Community College also calls Mitchell County home. Founded by an act of the North Carolina General Assembly in 1971, Mayland hosts some 35 curriculum programs and provides vocational and technical training, along with college transfer opportunities to residents of the region.

Penland School of Crafts is a educational facility located in the Penland Community.  It is designed to educate students who will apply workable knowledge in creation of books, paper, clay, drawing, glass, iron, metals, photography, printmaking and letterpress, textiles, and wood. The school was established in the early 1920s, it is the largest and oldest professional crafts school in the United States.

Media
The county is served by The Mitchell News-Journal, a weekly newspaper printed by Community Newspapers, Inc. and WTOE radio, at 1470 kHz on the AM dial to cover local news.

Communities

Towns
 Bakersville (county seat)
 Spruce Pine (largest town)

Townships

 Bakersville
 Bradshaw
 Cane Creek
 Fork Mountain-Little Rock Creek
 Grassy Creek
 Harrell
 Poplar
 Red Hill
 Snow Creek
 Spruce Pine

Unincorporated communities

 Bailey Settlement
 Bandana
 Buladean
 Clarrissa
 Estatoe
  Hawk
 Kona
 Ledger
 Little Switzerland
 Loafers Glory
 Penland
 Poplar
 Tipton Hill
 Red Hill

See also
 List of counties in North Carolina
 National Register of Historic Places listings in Mitchell County, North Carolina
 List of North Carolina State Parks#State Natural Areas
 National Park Service
 List of national forests of the United States

References

External links

 
 
 NCGenWeb Mitchell County - free genealogy resources for the county

 
Counties of Appalachia
1861 establishments in North Carolina
Populated places established in 1861
Sundown towns in North Carolina